The Cape Government Railways 1st Class  of 1881 was a South African steam locomotive from the pre-Union era in the Cape of Good Hope.

In 1881, the Cape Government Railways placed six more 1st Class tank-and-tender locomotives with a  American type wheel arrangement in service on the Midland System. These engines were built as tender locomotives, without on-board coal bunkers and with permanently attached coal and water tenders.

Manufacturer
Six  side-tank-and-tender passenger locomotives were built for the Cape Government Railways (CGR) by Neilson and Company in 1881, numbered in the range from M44 to M49 in the Midland System's number range. They were built to the same specifications as the eleven 1st Class  locomotives of 1875, but without the onboard coal bunker and with the plate frame shortened accordingly. Instead, they were equipped with permanently attached six-wheeled tenders with an estimated capacity of  water and  coal.

They were also designated 1st Class when a locomotive classification system was introduced by the CGR.

Service

Cape Government Railways

At the time these locomotives entered service, the two Midland lines from Port Elizabeth were open as far as Graaff Reinet and Cradock respectively.

One of these locomotives, no. M48, later became known as the Colesberg Buster during the years it worked on the line between Colesberg Junction and Colesberg town. In this role, it was equipped with one of the older small four-wheeled tenders.

According to some sources, one of these locomotives, no. 445, was sold to the Nyasaland Railways at some stage. This has since been proven untrue, since no evidence of such a sale have come to light and the particular locomotive is referred to in the South African Railways (SAR) renumbering and classification lists of 1912 as being at Uitenhage and recommended for scrapping.

Oranje-Vrijstaat Gouwerment-Spoorwegen
The Oranje-Vrijstaat Gouwerment-Spoorwegen (OVGS) acquired its first locomotives second-hand from the CGR towards the end of 1896. The OVGS 1st Class was, according to the original engine power chart of that railway, a  tank-and-tender locomotive with a three-axle tender.

More likely candidates which better fit the description on the OVGS engine power chart in respect of cylinder bore, tender and lack of onboard coal bunker, may be one or more of these 1st Class  engines of 1881, numbers 444, 446 and 447, which were last reflected on the CGR roster in 1896.

South African Railways
When the Union of South Africa was established on 31 May 1910, the three Colonial government railways (CGR, Natal Government Railways and Central South African Railways) were united under a single administration to control and administer the railways, ports and harbours of the Union. Although the South African Railways and Harbours came into existence in 1910, the actual classification and renumbering of all the rolling stock of the three constituent railways was only implemented with effect from 1 January 1912.

By 1912, only three of these locomotives survived. One was locomotive no. 445, which had allegedly earlier been sold to Nyasaland and which, at the time, was found to be rostered at Uitenhage on the Midland system. It was considered obsolete by the SAR and was excluded from the classification and renumbering schedules. The other two, numbers 448 and 449, were also considered obsolete and were therefore designated Class 01 and renumbered to 0448 and 0449 respectively. They were all withdrawn from service in 1913.

Renumbering
All these locomotives were renumbered at least three times during the CGR era, whenever a new numbering system was adopted. By 1886, the system prefixes had been done away with, the "M" having been replaced by the numeral "1". Further renumbering was applied by 1890 and again by 1896, when first the leading numeral "1" was replaced by the numeral "2" by 1890, and the leading numeral "2" was, in turn, replaced by the numeral "4" by 1896.

The works numbers, original numbers and renumbering of the Cape 1st Class 4-4-0TT are listed in the table.

References

0220
4-4-0 locomotives
2′B n2 locomotives
Neilson locomotives
Cape gauge railway locomotives
Railway locomotives introduced in 1881
1881 in South Africa
Scrapped locomotives